Győri ETO FC II is the second team of Győri ETO FC and this year they play in the Western group of the Hungarian National Championship II.

References
 Hivatasos Labdarugok Szervezete

External links
 Official Website of the Club

Football clubs in Hungary
Association football clubs established in 1904
Sport in Győr
Győri ETO FC